Liverpool Boys High School is a government-funded single-sex comprehensive secondary day school for boys, located in , a south-western suburb of Sydney, New South Wales, Australia.

Established in 1955 as the suburb's first high school, the school caters for approximately 550 students from Year 7 to Year 12; many of whom come from a background of socio-economic disadvantage. The school is operated by the New South Wales Department of Education; the principal is Mike Saxon.

Notable alumni 
 Mark BosnichAustralian and international soccer player 
 Michael Clarkecricketer
 Geoff Gerardrugby league football player
 Eric Grothe Sr.rugby league football player
 John Newmanformer NSW State MP 
 Tony Williamsrugby league football player

See also 

 List of government schools in New South Wales
 Education in Australia

References

External links 
 

Boys' schools in New South Wales
Public high schools in Sydney
1955 establishments in Australia
Educational institutions established in 1955
Liverpool, New South Wales